Khong bah png (alternatively 焢肉飯, 爌肉飯), as known as Braised pork rice, is a gaifan dish found in Fujianese cuisine and Taiwanese cuisine. Although subject to regional variations, dishes are typically made of pork belly cooked in a process known as lu (boiled and marinated in soy sauce and sugar) and served on top of rice. Chinese pickles are often eaten with the dish. 

Braised pork belly likely originated from Quanzhou, China, and was brought to Taiwan by immigrants during the Qing Dynasty. Along with the similar lo bah png (minced pork rice), khong bah png gradually became an integral part of Taiwanese xiaochi culture, commonly found at food stalls or bento stores. Similar dishes can be found within Hakka cuisine, Singaporean, and Malaysian cuisine. Braised pork rice is one of the most notable Taiwanese foods.

Etymology
Although "焢" and "爌" are both variant characters, the two are more commonly used in the name of the dish than "炕". Additionally, even though all three characters each have different pronunciations in Mandarin Chinese, the Taiwanese Hokkien pronunciation khòng is colloquially used in place. Therefore, the dish is commonly referred to as kòngròufàn in Mandarin.

In southern Taiwan, braised pork rice is referred to as 滷肉飯 (pinyin: lǔròufàn), which in northern and central Taiwan refers to minced pork rice. Minced pork rice is instead named "肉燥飯" in the south.

Khong bah png in Changhua

Khong bah png is one of the three essential dishes in Changhua cuisine, along with ba-wan and cat-mouse noodles (similar to ta-a mi). The main difference is that rear leg pork is chosen instead of pork belly. Since the fat and lean meat from this cut often separates during preparation, vendors usually connect the two with a toothpick. The dish is eaten throughout the day, even including breakfast and siu yeh.

In 2011, Changhua hosted a festival for Khong bah png. Eighteen local vendors were invited to serve the dish, and the event was visited by President Ma Ying-jeou.

See also

 List of pork dishes
 Taiwanese cuisine
 Lo bah png (Minced pork rice)

References

Chinese rice dishes
Chinese pork dishes
Taiwanese rice dishes